"Shadilay" is an Italo disco song by the Italian band P.E.P.E., released in 1986 by the music label Magic Sound. It was written by Italian singer-songwriter Marco Ceramicola, who sang under the pseudonym of Manuele Pepe.

It gained attention in 2016 for the band name's similarity to the meme Pepe the Frog, the single's cover also featuring a drawing of a cartoon frog. The album cover belongs to Magic Sound, and has been used in multiple songs produced by them, including "Babababo" by Bibox. It has since been used as the anthem for the fictional country of Kekistan. Ceramicola had since abandoned his career in the music industry. He felt that the newfound worldwide audience the song received online was unexpected.

Composition
"Shadilay" is an Electronic-Italo disco song. Set in the key of G# minor, it has a moderate tempo of 103 beats per minute. The instrumentation consists of a DX7 Keyboard.

Track listing
12" Single (Magic Sound – MASNP 007)
 "Shadilay" (Vocal) – 6:06
 "Shadilay" (Instrumental) – 6:05

Personnel
 Written by Marco Ceramicola
 Lead vocals by Manuele Pepe 
Arranged by Massimo Marcolini

Notes

References

Italo disco songs
1986 singles
1986 songs
Alt-right
Internet memes introduced in 2016